Mount Curi is a mountain in Manatuto District, East Timor. It is part of the Mount Curi Important Bird Area and has an elevation of 1,332 m.

Mountains of East Timor